The Luzzu oil field is an oil field located in the Mediterranean Sea. It was discovered in 2006 and developed by Mediterranean Oil & Gas. It will begin production in 2015 and will produce oil.

References

Oil fields in Malta